Turnberry Estate is a suburb of Bloxwich in the Metropolitan Borough of Walsall in the West Midlands, England.

The estate is served by the X51 National Express West Midlands bus route and Bloxwich North railway station which is located on the south western edge of the estate.

Walsall